Larry Craig Strickland (born June 7, 1955) is an American politician from North Carolina. He was elected to the North Carolina House of Representatives in 2016. A Republican, he has represented the 28th district (including constituents in Southern Johnston County) since 2017. Strickland had previously served on the Johnston County School Board from 1998 to 2016.

Electoral history

2020

2018

2016

Committee assignments

2021-2022 Session
Appropriations (Chair)
Appropriations - Agriculture and Natural and Economic Resources Committee (Vice Chair)
Agriculture (Vice Chair)
Commerce 
Education - K-12 
Energy and Public Utilities

2019-2020 Session
Appropriations (Vice Chair)
Appropriations - Agriculture and Natural and Economic Resources Committee (Chair)
Agriculture (Chair)
Commerce 
Education - K-12 
Energy and Public Utilities

2017-2018 Session
Appropriations
Appropriations - Transportation
Agriculture
Energy and Public Utilities
Environment
Transportation
State and Local Government I

References

External links

Living people
1955 births
People from Smithfield, North Carolina
Barton College alumni
Republican Party members of the North Carolina House of Representatives
21st-century American politicians